Glochidion rapaense, also known by its synonym Phyllanthus rapaense, is a species of tree in the family Phyllanthaceae. It is endemic to the island of Rapa in the Austral Islands of French Polynesia. Molecular phylogenetic analysis indicates that it is extremely closely related to Glochidion longfieldiae, which is also endemic to Rapa.

References

Flora of French Polynesia
rapaense
Near threatened plants
Taxonomy articles created by Polbot